Muslim sharia law that was prominent during the Ottoman Empire is family law. This law relates to marriage, children, and divorce. Family law falls under the category of private law in the Ottoman Empire. Family and inheritance law was at the very center of Ottoman law, and thus was least affected by the penetration of foreign law. Family law also had a significant role in establishing the gender roles in Islamic society in the Ottoman Empire. During the Tanzimat Period in the Ottoman Empire with the Empire's new focus on bureaucracy, they began to collect information on the families living under their rule including births, marriages, and deaths.

The Ottoman Law of Family Rights
The Ottoman Law of Family Rights is a new codification in Ottoman law that emerged in 1917. This law remained legitimate in Jordan until the year of 1951, and Syria in 1949. It is still valid for Muslim citizens of Israel and Lebanon. This law reestablished family law, specifically in regards to marriage and divorce, children and inheritance, and men and women's roles. One of the main reasons for the creation of the Ottoman Law of Family Rights and a reform of family laws in the Ottoman Empire, was to give women better access to divorce. However, it is argued by scholar Judith Tucker that the Ottoman Law of Family Rights did little to advance women's rights in the Ottoman Empire.

References

Ottoman law
Islamic family law